is a train station located on the Kintetsu Yoshino Line in Takatori, Takaichi District, Nara Prefecture, Japan. Tsubosakadera temple and Takatori castle are near the station.

Lines 
 Kintetsu Railway
 Yoshino Line

Platforms and tracks

Surroundings
 
 Tsubosaka-dera
 Kojima-dera
 Ruin of Takatori Castle (a part of 100 Fine Castles of Japan)
 Takatori Town Office
 Takatori Post Office

External links

References

Railway stations in Japan opened in 1923
Stations of Kintetsu Railway
Railway stations in Nara Prefecture